Olof – forsfararen is a 1947 Swedish-language Finnish drama film directed by Teuvo Tulio and starring Regina Linnanheimo, Kullervo Kalske and Eric Gustafson. The film was shot in parallel with the Finnish-language version Intohimon vallassa.

Cast
 Regina Linnanheimo as Britta Stor-Övergård
 Kullervo Kalske as Olof
 Eric Gustafson as Paul Stor-Övergård
 Aku Peltonen as farm-worker
 Elli Ylimaa as Anderssonskan
 Oscar Tengström as Britta's father
 Kaija Suonio as Britta's mother

References

External links 
 Olof – forsfararen on elonet.finna.fi
 

1947 films
1947 drama films
Finnish drama films
Swedish-language films from Finland
Films directed by Teuvo Tulio
Finnish black-and-white films